Marco Previde Massara (born 1958) a former Italian male canoeist who won seven medals at senior level at the Wildwater Canoeing World Championships.

Biography
After finishing his activity in the sport of canoeing, he became an athlete of masters cycling.

References

External links
 

1958 births
Living people
Italian male canoeists
Masters cyclists